John Hunt (by 1514 – 27 March 1586) was an English politician.

Hunt was a graduate of Cardinal College, Oxford and a lawyer. In 1531 he acted  as tutor to Gregory Cromwell at Pembroke College, Cambridge. He was a Member (MP) of the Parliament of England for Rutland in April 1554.

References

1586 deaths
English MPs 1554
Year of birth uncertain
Alumni of Christ Church, Oxford